Gonzalo de Jesús Rivera Gómez (3 November 1933 – 20 October 2019) was a Colombian Roman Catholic auxiliary bishop.

Rivera Gómez was born in Colombia and ordained to the priesthood in 1960. He served as titular bishop of Bennefa and as auxiliary bishop of the Roman Catholic Archdiocese of Medellín, Colombia, from 1988 to 2010.

Notes

1933 births
2019 deaths
21st-century Roman Catholic bishops in Colombia
20th-century Roman Catholic bishops in Colombia
Roman Catholic bishops of Medellín